The Lulu Awards were a group of literary awards, presented at Comic-Con International in San Diego, California, by the Friends of Lulu. The awards were intended to "recognize the people and projects that help open the eyes and minds to the amazing comic and cartooning work by and/or about women." The awards were separated into five categories: Lulu of the Year, Kimberly Yale Award for Best New Talent, Volunteer of the Year Award, Women of Distinction Award, and the Women Cartoonists Hall of Fame.

Lulu of the Year
The Lulu of the Year honor went to creator(s), book(s), or other projects "whose work best exemplifies Friends of Lulu’s mission."

1997
The Great Women Superheroes, by Trina Robbins (Kitchen Sink Press)
Action Girl, Sarah Dyer, editor (Slave Labor Graphics)
Girl Talk, Isabella Bannerman, Ann Decker, & Sabrina Jones, editors (Fantagraphics)
Leave It To Chance, by James Robinson & Paul Smith (comics)
Marilyn: The Story of a Woman, Kathryn Hyatt, (7 Stories Press)
Strangers in Paradise, Terry Moore (Homage Comics)

1998
Action Girl, Sarah Dyer, editor (Slave Labor Graphics)
Abby Denson, Tough Love: High School Confidential, Freedom Set, and work in XY Magazine
Linda Medley, Castle Waiting (Olio)
Dave Roman and John Green, Quicken Forbidden
Jill Thompson, Scary Godmother (Sirius Entertainment)

1999
Scary Godmother, by Jill Thompson (Sirius Entertainment)
Akiko, by Mark Crilley (Sirius Entertainment)
The Amazing "True" Story of a Teenage Single Mom, by Katherine Arnoldi (Hyperion Books)
Castle Waiting, by Linda Medley (Olio)
A Child's Life and Other Stories, by Phoebe Gloeckner (Frog, Ltd., an imprint of North Atlantic Books)
Queen of the Black Black, by Megan Kelso (Highwater)

2000
Trina Robbins, From Girls to Grrrlz
Mark Crilley Akiko
Ellen Forney, Monkey Food
Jim Ottaviani, Dignifying Science
Dori Seda Dori Stories, edited by Kate Kane and Don Donahue
Jill Thompson, Scary Godmother comics and books

2001
Trina Robbins, and Anne Timmons, Go-Girl!
Sequential Tart, Marcia Allass, editor, and staff
Greg Beettam & Stephe Geigen-Miller Xeno's Arrow
Chynna Clugston-Major, Blue Monday
Mark Crilley, Akiko
Les Daniels, Wonder Woman: The Complete History
Roberta Gregory
Rachel Hartmann, Amy Unbounded
Lea Hernandez, Cathedral Child and Rumble Girls
Janet Hetherington, Eternally Yours
Lynn Johnston, For Better or For Worse
Lawrence Marvit, Sparks
Kevin Mason & Alex Szewczuk Sleeping Dragons
Scott McCloud, Reinventing Comics
Linda Medley, Castle Waiting (Olio)
Terry Moore, Strangers in Paradise
Carla Speed McNeil, Finder
Mark Oakley, Thieves and Kings
Paul Pope, THB
Powerpuff Girls comics, various, Joan Hilty, editor
Dave Roman and John Green, Quicken Forbidden
Posy Simmonds Gemma Bovery
Jeff Smith, Bone
Jeff Smith and Charles Vess, Rose
Dave McKinnon and Terry Wiley, Sleaze Castle/Petra Etcetra
Jill Thompson, Scary Godmother
Andi Watson, Breakfast After Noon
Mary Wilshire

2002
Sequential Tart, Marcia Allas, editor
Chynna Clugston-Major, Blue Monday
Lea Hernandez, Cathedral Child
Carla Speed McNeil, Finder
Jill Thompson, Scary Godmother

2003
Free Comic Book Day (2002: inaugural year), Joe Field, organizer
Alison Bechdel , Dykes to Watch Out For
Chynna Clugston-Major, Blue Monday
Clamp (four female creators of manga, including Card Captor Sakura, Magic Knight Rayearth, and X/1999)
Jen Van Meter and Christine Norrie Hopeless Savages trade paperback

2004
Lea Hernandez, editor, Girlamatic.com
Jen Contino, Comicon.com/Pulse.com
Jane Irwin, Vogelein
Lawrence Klein, founder of the Museum of Comic and Cartoon Art
Marjane Satrapi, Persepolis

2005
Shaenon Garrity, (Girlamatic.com, the Cartoon Art Museum)
Devin Grayson (DC Comics)
Megan Kelso, Scheherazade
TokyoPop website (tokyopop.com)
Flight Anthology website (flightcomics.com)

2006
 Scholastic/Graphix (publisher of The Baby-sitters Club, Queen Bee, Breaking Up)
 Jen Contino (Comicon.com/Pulse, contributor)
 Gail Simone (writer of Birds of Prey)
 Girlamatic.com (Comics hosting website)
 Zeus Comics/CAPE (Retailer/Comics and Pop Culture Expo)

2007
 Abby Denson (Tough Love: High School Confidential)
 Alison Bechdel (Fun Home, Dykes to Watch Out For)
 Donna Barr (The Desert Peach, Stinz)

2008
 Marjane Satrapi
 Audra Furuichi
 gURL Comix
 Stephanie McMillan
 Rutu Modan

2009
 Danielle Corsetto for Girls with Slingshots

Women Cartoonists Hall of Fame
In 2009, shortly before the demise of the Friends of Lulu, the Hall of Fame was renamed The Female Cartoonists And Comic Book Writer's Hall Of Fame.

1997
Marie Severin, EC and Marvel Comics
Marge Henderson Buell, creator of Little Lulu
Edwina Dumm
Ramona Fradon, Silver Age artist (Aquaman, Metamorpho) and Brenda Starr, Reporter comic strip
Dale Messick, creator, Brenda Starr, Reporter

1998
Dale Messick, Brenda Starr, Reporter
Marjorie Henderson Buell
Ramona Fradon
Lynn Johnston, For Better or For Worse
Trina Robbins, cartoonist; author, A Century of Women Superheroes

1999
Ramona Fradon
Marge Henderson Buell
Lynn Johnston
Trina Robbins

2000
Marge Henderson Buell
Fran Hopper (Fiction House comics, 1940s)
Tarpe Mills, (Miss Fury)
Lily Renee (Fiction House comics, 1940s)
Hilda Terry, TeenaRumiko Takahashi, Ranma ½, Urusei Yatsura, other manga

2001
Tie:
Trina Robbins
Hilda Terry
Roberta Gregory
Lea Hernandez
Lynn Johnston
Lee Marrs
Linda Medley
Wendy Pini, ElfquestDorothy Woolfolk Roubicek
Dori Seda
Rumiko Takahashi

2002
 Lynn Johnston
Nell Brinkley, early 20th century cartoonist/illustrator
Wendy Pini, ElfquestBarb Rausch, BarbieDorothy Woolfolk Roubicek
Rumiko Takahashi

2003
 Wendy Pini
Lynda Barry, Marlys and One! Hundred! Demons!Barb Rausch, Vicki Valentine and BarbieDorothy Woolfolk Roubicek
Rumiko Takahashi

2004
Lynda Barry (Marlys, 100 Demons)
Amanda Conner, Vampirella, Soulsearchers & Co.Barb Rausch
Dorothy Woolfolk Roubicek
Rumiko Takahashi

2005
Donna Barr, A Fine Line PressNell Brinkley, The Three GracesAmanda Conner
Phoebe Gloeckner, The Diary of a Teenage GirlRumiko Takahashi
Jill Thompson, Scary Godmother, Death: At Death’s Door2006

 Roberta Gregory (Naughty Bits, Artistic Licentiousness)
 Phoebe Gloeckner (The Diary of a Teenage Girl)
 Linda Medley (Castle Waiting)
 Rose O'Neill (creator, Kewpie dolls)
 Jill Thompson (Scary Godmother)
 Carol Tyler (The Job Thing, Late Bloomer)

2007

 Colleen Doran (A Distant Soil, The Book of Lost Souls)
 Lily Renee Phillips (The Lost World, Werewolf Hunters)
 Donna Barr (The Desert Peach, Stinz)

2008
 Nell Brinkley
 Marty Links
 Tarpe Mills
 Louise Simonson

2009
 Gail Simone

Kimberly Yale Award for Best New Talent

1997
 Jessica Abel, ArtbabeJen Benka. ManyaAriel Bordeaux, Deep GirlKris Dresen, Manya; Action GirlJennifer Graves, Robin; SupergirlKathryn Hyatt, Marilyn: The Story of a WomanCarla Speed McNeil, Finder, Shanda the PandaUrsula O'Steen, Girl Talk, Pure FrictionElizabeth Watasin, A-Girl, Action GirlChristina Z, Witchblade1998
Carla Speed McNeil, FinderJenny Gonzalez, Kronikle KomixDevin Grayson, CatwomanTara Jenkins, GalaxionAriel Schrag, Definition; Potential1999
Devin Grayson, Catwoman, Black Widow
Dawn Brown, Little Red Hot
Chynna Clugston-Major, "Blue Monday" in Action Girl and Oni Double Feature
Jane Fisher & Kirsten Petersen, WJHC
Rachel Hartman, Amy Unbounded
Ariel Schrag, Definition; Potential
Jen Sorensen, Slowpoke
Tara Tallan, Galaxion
Maggie Whorf, BoHoS

2000
Rachel Hartman (Amy Unbounded)
Kalah Allen (Jann of Renew)
Rachel Nacion, misspelled "Rachel Ancion" (Shades of Blue)
Suzanne Baumann, misspelled "Suzanne Bowman" (Fridge Magnet Stories)
Chynna Clugston-Major (Blue Monday)
Leela Corman, misspelled "Leelah Corman" (Flim Flam, Queen's Day)
Alison Williams (Sorcerer's Children)

2001
Anne Timmons (Go Girl)
Fiona Avery (No Honor, Rogue, Fionaverse)
Robyn Chapman (Theater of the Meek)
Catherine Doherty (Can of Worms)
Rachel Dodson (Harley Quinn)
Jennifer Feinberg (Little Scrowlie)
Shaenon K. Garrity (Narbonic)
Rebecca Guay (Green Lantern: 1001 Emerald Nights)
Gisele Lagace (Coolcatstudio.com)
Gail Simone (Simpsons comics)
Jen Sorenson
Elizabeth Watasin (Charm School);

2002
Tie:
Gisele Lagace (Cool Cat Studio)
Ashley-Jane Nicolaus (writer, Haven)
Dorothy Gambrell (Cat and Girl, New Adventures of Death)
Layla Lawlor (Raven's Children)
Lark Pien (Stories from the Ward)

2003
Raina Telgemeier (Take Out Comics)
Layla Lawlor (Raven's Children)
Jenn Manley Lee (Dicebox)
Joanne Mutch (Rummblestrips)
Justine Shaw (Nowhere Girl)

2004
Lark Pien (Long Tail Kitty)
2004 Nominees - Sara Beeves (Girly Comic: Mockaroni & Cheese)
Dylan Meconis (Bite Me!)
Christina Weir (Skinwalker, New Mutants)

2005
Vera Brosgol (Flight, Hopeless Savages B-Sides)
Stephanie Freese (Ripped from the Headlines)
Dorothy Gambrell (Cat and Girl)
Emily Horne (www.asofterworld.com)
Tintin Pantoja (Sevenplains, Girlamatic.com, and www.mentaltentacle.com)

2006

 Leigh Dragoon (By the Wayside)
 Hope Larson
 Clio Chiang, misspelled "Clio Chang"
 Liz Prince
 MK Reed

2007

 Rachel Nabors (Crow Princess, Rachel the Great)
 June Kim (12 Days)
 Rivkah (Steady Beat)
 Joelle Jones (12 Reasons Why I Love Her)

2008
 Martina Fugazzotto
 Kiki Jones
 Julia Wertz (The Fart Party)

2009
 Kate Beaton, for Hark! A Vagrant

Volunteer of the Year Award
2003
 Dave Roman (Editor, Broad Appeal)
 Chris Kohler (webmaster)

2004
 Charlie Boatner

2005
 Marc Wilkofsky (New York Chapter)

2006
 Donnie Tracey (Gotham City Limits)

2007
 MK Reed
 Robin Enrico

2008
 Lee Binswanger

Women of Distinction Award

2004
Maggie Thompson, editor, Comics Buyer's Guide
Carol Kalish (posthumous) former vice-president, New Product Development, Marvel Comics
Trina Robbins, author, historian
Mimi Rosenheim, editor, AIT-PlanetLar
Diana Schutz, editor, Dark Horse Comics

2005
Heidi MacDonald editor The Beat
Karen Berger, editor, DC Comics / Vertigo Comics
Vijaya Iyer, editor, Cartoon Books
Mimi Rosenheim, editor, AIT-PlanetLar
Diana Schutz, editor, Dark Horse Comics

2006

 Diana Schutz (Editor, Dark Horse Comics)
 Karen Berger (Editor, DC/Vertigo)
 Jackie Estrada (Exhibit A Press, Administrator Eisner Awards)
 Françoise Mouly (Art Director, The New Yorker)
 Ronee Garcia Bougeious (Comics News Editor and columnist, PopCultureShock.com)

2007
 Jennifer de Guzman (Editor-In-Chief, Slave Labor Graphics)
 Joan Hilty (Editor, DC)
 Karen Berger (senior VP, DC/Vertigo)

2008
 Shelly Bond
 Cindy Fournier
 Janna Morishima

2009
 Joanne Carter Siegel

Leah Adezio Award for Best Kid-Friendly Work
 2009 : Shannon, Dean and Nathan Hale, Rapunzel's Revenge

Best Female Character
 2009 : Monica Villarreal, from Wapsi Square by Paul Taylor

See also

 Female comics creators
 List of literary awards honoring women
 List of 20th century women artists

References

External links
 
 
 Comic-Con Watch: Meet the Brain Janes, S. Crabtree, Los Angeles Times, July 27, 2007

Lulu Award
Female comics artists